Altrincham is a town in the Metropolitan Borough of Trafford, Greater Manchester, England.  The town, together with the adjacent areas of Broadheath  and Timperley, contains 52 listed buildings that are recorded in the National Heritage List for England.  Of these, one is listed at Grade II*, the middle grade, and the others are at Grade II, the lowest grade.

Altrincham originated as a market town.  The Bridgewater Canal was built passing through the Broadheath area in 1765, and the railway arrived in 1849.  During the 19th century the town grew as a commercial centre, and as a commuter town for Manchester.  The oldest listed building dates from the middle of the 18th century, and most date from the early and middle 19th century.  The majority of listed buildings are houses and associated structures, and commercial and civic buildings.  Some industry arose adjacent to the Bridgewater Canal, but the only listed buildings surviving from this are buildings associated with a former factory.  A bridge crossing the canal is also listed.  The other listed buildings include churches and a vicarage, public houses, a boundary stone, a clock tower, and a war memorial.



Key

Buildings

References

Citations

Sources

Lists of listed buildings in Greater Manchester
Listed